Indirect presidential elections are scheduled to be held in Latvia on 31 May 2023.

Background 
Political scientist and historian Gatis Krūmiņš, believed the Latvian presidential election could cause friction in the Second Kariņš cabinet and potentially lead to its downfall due to disagreements on who should be the presidential candidate.

Voting system 
Before the first round of the presidential election, the political parties represented in the Saeima nominate their candidate.

The president is elected in the first round if he receives the absolute majority of the deputies, i.e. 51 votes out of 100.

In case of failure, another round is organized with the same candidates or different ones, and under the same conditions. If no one is elected, others rounds are held until a candidate receives 51 votes and becomes President of Latvia. The president of the Saeima chairs the electoral college.

References 

Latvia
Presidential election
Presidential elections in Latvia